Dibrugarh Hanumanbux Surajmal Kanoi Commerce College  was established in 1960 in Dibrugarh, Assam. The college is affiliated with Dibrugarh University; its Higher Secondary Course is recognised by the AHSEC.

The college offers a two-year Higher Secondary Course in Commerce stream and a three-year Bachelor of Commerce degree.

History
The intermediate level was first introduced in D.H.S.K. College in 1945 in the evening shift. The foundation stone of the present college building was laid by Late Morarji Desai, the then Finance Minister of India. Classes of Dibrugarh University  initially started in this college till 1968. It is the first full-fledged Commerce College in the North Eastern region of India.

Academics
The college offers 2 year higher secondary course under AHSEC and 3 year B.Com  degree with specialization in Accounting and Finance, Marketing, International Business, Banking and Insurance, E-Commerce and H.R. Management or in general under Dibrugarh University. It also offers courses under Krishna Kanta Handique State Open University.

References

Universities and colleges in Assam
Dibrugarh
Colleges affiliated to Dibrugarh University
1960 establishments in Assam
Educational institutions established in 1960